Alan Morrison (born 3 March 1971) is a British racing driver who resides in Northern Ireland.

Racing career

A former British Champion in motocross and winner of a single 125cc Motocross World Championship race, he first started circuit racing in the Ford Fiesta championship in 1997 and again this time winning the championship in 1998. He entered the Vauxhall Vectra Sri Challenge in 1999, finishing 2nd on points. For 2000 Morrison was in the British Touring Car Championship's newly introduced class B. With his Peugeot 306 Gti he won the class championship with 13 class B wins. He is probably best known that year for a huge crash at Brands Hatch where he went into a barrel roll going round the Grand Prix circuit. In 2002 he got a BTCC touring class works drive for Honda, ran by Arena in a Honda Civic Type-R. He drove with Andy Priaulx as teammate and finished 9th in the championship, including one race win, at Donington Park. He stayed with the team the following year with a new teammate in Matt Neal, and finished an impressive 5th on points.  Morrison returned to the BTCC in 2009, as a late entry back with Arena Motorsport (under the Team Aon banner) in a Ford Focus ST but left the team after the Oulton Park weekend.

Racing record

Complete British Touring Car Championship results
(key) Races in bold indicate pole position (1 point awarded – 2001 all races, 2006–present just in first race, 2001 in class) Races in italics indicate fastest lap (1 point awarded – 2001–present all races, 2001 in class) * signifies that driver lead race for at least one lap (1 point given – 2001–present all races)

References

External links
Morrison's career stats from Driver Database
BTCC Official site

1971 births
Living people
Racing drivers from Northern Ireland
British Touring Car Championship drivers
Arena Motorsport drivers